The Affair of Baroness Orlovska is a 1923 German silent drama film directed by Hans Werckmeister and starring Willy Kaiser-Heyl, Dary Holm, and Viktor Gehring.

Cast

References

External links

1923 films
Films of the Weimar Republic
German silent feature films
Films directed by Hans Werckmeister
German black-and-white films
1920s German films